"The Weight" is a song by the Canadian-American group the Band that was released as a single in 1968 and on the group's debut album Music from Big Pink. It was their first release under this name, after their previous releases as Canadian Squires and Levon and the Hawks. Written by Band member Robbie Robertson, the song is about a visitor's experiences in a town mentioned in the lyric's first line as Nazareth. "The Weight" has significantly influenced American popular music, having been listed as No. 41 on Rolling Stones 500 Greatest Songs of All Time published in 2004. Pitchfork Media named it the 13th best song of the 1960s, and the Rock and Roll Hall of Fame named it one of the 500 Songs that Shaped Rock and Roll. PBS, which broadcast performances of the song on Ramble at the Ryman (2011), Austin City Limits (2012), and Quick Hits (2012), describes it as "a masterpiece of Biblical allusions, enigmatic lines and iconic characters" and notes its enduring popularity as "an essential part of the American songbook."

"The Weight" is one of the Band's best known songs, gaining considerable album-oriented rock airplay even though it was not a significant hit single for the group in the US, peaking at only No. 63. After it was released, the record debuted just six days later on KHJ's Boss 30' records" and peaked at No. 3 there three weeks later. The Band's recording also fared well in Canada and the UK, peaking at No. 35 in Canada and No. 21 in the UK in 1968. Cash Box called it a "powerhouse performance." American Songwriter and Stereogum both ranked the song number three on their lists of the Band's greatest songs. In 1968 and 1969, three cover versions were released; their arrangements appealed to a wide diversity of music audiences.

Composition
"The Weight" was written by Robbie Robertson, who found the tune by strumming idly on his guitar, when he noticed that the interior included a stamp noting that it was manufactured in Nazareth, Pennsylvania and he started crafting the lyrics as he played. The inspiration for and influences affecting the composition of "The Weight" came from the music of the American South, the life experiences of band members, particularly Levon Helm, and movies of filmmakers Ingmar Bergman and Luis Buñuel.

The original members of the Band performed "The Weight" as an American Southern folk song with country music (vocals, guitars and drums) and gospel music (piano and organ) elements. The lyrics, written in the first-person, are about a traveler's experiences arriving, visiting, and departing a town called Nazareth, in which the traveler's friend, Fanny, has asked him to look up some of her friends. According to Robertson, Fanny is based on Frances "Fanny" Steloff, the founder of a New York City bookstore where he explored scripts by Buñuel. The town is based on Nazareth, Pennsylvania, because it was the home of Martin Guitars. Robertson wrote the guitar parts on a 1951 Martin D-28. The singers, led by Helm, vocalize the traveler's encounters with people in the town from the perspective of a Bible Belt American Southerner, like Helm himself, a native of rural Arkansas.

The characters in "The Weight" were based on real people that members of the Band knew, as Helm explained in his autobiography, This Wheel's on Fire. In particular, "young Anna Lee" mentioned in the third verse is Helm's longtime friend Anna Lee Amsden, and, according to her, "Carmen" was from Helm's hometown, Turkey Scratch, Arkansas. "Crazy Chester" was an eccentric resident of Fayetteville, Arkansas, who carried a cap gun. Ronnie Hawkins would tell him to "keep the peace" at his Rockwood Club when Chester arrived.

According to Robertson, "The Weight" was inspired by the movies of Spanish filmmaker Luis Buñuel, whose films are known for their surreal imagery and criticism of organized religion, particularly Catholicism. The song's lyrics and music invoke vivid imagery, the main character's perspective is influenced by the Bible, and the episodic story was inspired by the predicaments Buñuel's film characters faced that undermined their goals for maintaining or improving their moral character. Of this, Robertson once stated:

Personnel
Credits are adapted from the liner notes of A Musical History.
Levon Helm – lead and harmony vocals, drums
Rick Danko – co-lead and harmony vocals, bass guitar
Richard Manuel – Hammond organ, harmony vocals
Garth Hudson – piano
Robbie Robertson – acoustic guitar

Songwriting credit dispute
The songwriting credit to Robbie Robertson for "The Weight", like credit for many of the songs performed by the Band, was disputed years later by Levon Helm. Helm insisted that the composition of the lyrics and the music was collaborative, declaring that each band member made a substantial contribution. In an interview, Helm credited Robertson with 60 percent of the lyrics, Danko and Manuel with 20 percent each of the lyrics, much of the music credit to Garth Hudson, and a small credit to himself for lyrics.

Versions by other artists

The Staple Singers recorded "The Weight" for their 1968 album Soul Folk in Action, which was described as one of two album highlights in a review. The group later collaborated with the Band to record a joint performance for the 1976 film The Last Waltz.
Jackie DeShannon recorded it for her 1968 album Laurel Canyon. Released as a single, it reached number 55 on the Billboard Hot 100 on September 28, 1968.
Aretha Franklin released a cover of "The Weight" in 1969, that reached number 19 on the Billboard Hot 100 and number four on its Rhythm & Blues Singles chart on March 22, 1969.
A 1969 version by Smith is used on the Easy Rider film soundtrack. The Band's record label Capitol did not allow the Band's recording to be used on the soundtrack album, so it "was replaced by a near-copy recorded by Dunhill [the soundtrack album label] act Smith".
In 1969, Diana Ross & the Supremes and the Temptations recorded a version of "The Weight" for their album Together. Released as a single, it appeared on several charts, including numbers 46 on Billboard magazine's Hot 100 and 33 on its Best Selling Soul Singles charts.
In 2006, Canadian country music artist Aaron Pritchett covered "The Weight" on his album Big Wheel. It was released as a single and reached number six on the Billboard Canada Country chart, and number 90 on the Canadian Hot 100.
The Grateful Dead covered the song 40 times between 1990 and 1994, usually as an encore.  Jerry Garcia would sing the first verse, followed by the keyboardist (whichever was in the band at the time), then bassist Phil Lesh, then guitarist Bobby Weir.  The entire band would sing the final verse in unison.  The song appeared on several live albums released by the Grateful Dead, including 'Spring 1990', 'Giants Stadium 1987, 1989, 1991' and 'Dave's Picks Volume 40.

References

Footnotes

1968 songs
1968 debut singles
1969 singles
1993 singles
The Band songs
Aaron Pritchett songs
Aretha Franklin songs
The Supremes songs
The Temptations songs
Songs written by Robbie Robertson
Northampton County, Pennsylvania
Song recordings produced by John Simon (record producer)
Capitol Records singles
Roots rock songs

pl:The Weight#The Weight